Rogshajyay, also spelt as "Rogashojyay" or "Rogashajyaya", (Bengali: রোগশয্যায়; English: "From the sickbed") is a Bengali language poetry book written by Rabindranath Tagore. It was published in 1940. It is a significant work at the "Last Phase" of Rabindranath's poetry.

References

External links 

 Rogshajyay text – wikisource (Bengali)

 rabindra-rachanabali.nltr.org (Bengali)

1940 poetry books
Bengali poetry collections
Poetry collections by Rabindranath Tagore
Rabindranath_Tagore
Indian_poetry_books